This is a list of buildings that are examples of the Art Deco architectural style in New Jersey, United States.

Asbury Park 
 Deal Lake Court Apartments, Asbury Park, 1930s
 Eureka Apartments (former Electric Company Building), Asbury Park, 1922
 Hot Mess Studio, Asbury Park
 Old Heating Plant, Asbury Park, 1930
 Paramount Theatre, Asbury Park, 1930

Camden 
 City Hall Camden, 1931
 KIPP Cooper Norcross High School, Camden
 Mastery Schools of Camden, McGraw Elementary, Camden
 McCrory's/Sam's Discount, Camden
 Pierre Building, 306 Cooper, Camden, 1932
 Rio Theatre (now a church), Camden, 1937
 United States Post Office and Courthouse, Camden, 1932

East Orange 
 30 South Munn, East Orange
 East Orange VA Hospital, East Orange, 1950
 West Colonial Apartments, East Orange

Elizabeth 
 Altenburg Piano House, Elizabeth, 1929
 Hersch Tower, Elizabeth, 1931
 Ritz Theatre, Elizabeth, 1925

Jersey City 
 295 Newark Avenue (former bank), Jersey City, 1929
 500 Commipaw Avenue (former Junction Fishery), Jersey City, 1920s
 872 Bergen Avenue, Jersey City
 875 Bergen Avenue, Jersey City
 910 Bergen Avenue, Jersey City
 911 Bergen Avenue, Jersey City
 918 Bergen Avenue, Jersey City
 924 Bergen Avenue, Jersey City
 A. Harry Moore School, Jersey City
 Bank of America Financial Center, Bergen Avenue, Jersey City
 Barcade, Jersey City
 The Beacon, Jersey City, 1931
 Bergen Theater (now Pix Theater), Jersey City
 Central Square Supermarket, Jersey City
 Hurwitz Building, Jersey City
 Jersey City Medical Center, Jersey City, 1934–1938
 Jones Hall, 591 Montgomery Street, Jersey City, 1939
 Kelly's Soul Food, Jersey City
 Miss America Diner, Jersey City, 1942
 National Discount House, Jersey City
 Ramada by Wyndham, Jersey City
 Roosevelt Stadium, Jersey City, 1937
 The Roxy Apartments, Jersey City, 1938
 White Mana Diner, Jersey City, 1939

Newark 
 87 Halsey, Newark
 771 Broad, Newark
 Chancellor Avenue Elementary School, Newark, 1938
 Eleven 80 (former Lefcourt–Newark Building), Newark, 1930
 First National State Bank Building, Newark, 1912
 Ivy Hill Elementary School, Newark, 1931
 Lyons Towers Condominiums, Newark, 1939
 National Newark Building, Newark, 1931
 New Jersey Bell Headquarters Building, Newark, 1929
 Newark Arts High School, Newark, 1931
 Newark Metropolitan Airport Buildings, Newark, 1928
 Newark School of Fine and Industrial Art, Newark, 1882 and 1928
 Pennsylvania Station, Newark, 1935
 Weequahic High School, Newark, 1932

Trenton 
 Maxine's (now Rio Sports Bar & Grill), Trenton, 1948
 Catholic Youth Organization (former RKO Broad Theatre), Trenton, 1920s
 Clarkson S. Fisher Federal Building and United States Courthouse, Trenton, 1932
 Daylight/Twilight Alternative High School, Trenton
 Hedgepeth–Williams Elementary School, Trenton
 Parker Elementary School, Trenton
 Paul Robeson Elementary School, Trenton
 Trenton War Memorial, Trenton, 1930
 Ulysses S. Grant Elementary School, Trenton, 1938
 Washington Elementary School, Trenton

Other cities 
 225 Larch Avenue, Teaneck, 1938
 Belvidere Theater, Belvidere, 1930s
 Bergen Performing Arts Center, Englewood, 1926
 Boardwalk Hall, Atlantic City, 1929
 Bow-Tie Warner Theater, Ridgeway, 1932
 Brook Arts Center, Bound Brook, 1927
 Donald and Morris Goodkind Bridges (former College Bridge), Edison to New Brunswick, 1929
 Fort Lee Borough Hall, Fort Lee, 1929
 Garden State Crematory, North Bergen, 1907
 Gateway 26 (former Hunts Casino), Wildwood, 1940
 Hunt's Casino, Wildwood, 1940
 Jersey City Central Power & Light Company, Keyport, 1930s
 Landis Theatre-Mori Brothers Building, Vineland (1937)
 Memorial Municipal Building, Fort Lee, 1929
 People's Bank and Trust Company Building, Passaic, 1931
 Route 46 Passaic River Bridge, Elmwood Park, 1955
 Sears, Roebuck, and Company Building, Hackensack, 1930s
 Temple Emanuel, Paterson, 1929
 Thomas Alva Edison Memorial Tower and Museum, Edison, 1938
 Ventnor Theater, Ventnor, 1922
 WMCA Transmitter Building, Kearny, 1940

See also 
 List of Art Deco architecture
 List of Art Deco architecture in the United States

References 

 "Art Deco & Streamline Moderne Buildings." Roadside Architecture.com. Retrieved 2019-01-03.
 Cinema Treasures. Retrieved 2022-09-06
 "Court House Lover". Flickr. Retrieved 2022-09-06
 "The Encyclopedia of Arkansas History and Culture". Archived from the original on 2019-01-04. Retrieved 2019-01-04.
 "New Deal Map". The Living New Deal. Retrieved 2020-12-25.
 "SAH Archipedia". Society of Architectural Historians. Retrieved 2021-11-21.

External links 
 

 
Art Deco
Art Deco architecture in New Jersey
New Jersey-related lists